Marie Louise Stig Sørensen  (born 1954) is a Danish archaeologist and academic. She is Professor of European Prehistory and Heritage Studies at the University of Cambridge and a Professor of Bronze Age Archaeology at the University of Leiden. Her research focuses on Bronze Age Europe, heritage, and archaeological theory.

Early life 
Sørensen was born in Denmark in 1954. She graduated from the University of Aarhus in 1981, and later received a Phd from the University of Cambridge in 1985 on the subject of the Bronze Age to Iron Age transition in Scandinavia.

Career 
Sørensen was appointed at the Department of Archaeology and Anthropology, University of Cambridge in 1987. In 2011 she was appointed a Reader at the University of Cambridge, and in 2012 she became a Professor in Bronze Age studies at the University of Leiden. She is a Fellow of Jesus College, Cambridge where she is Director of Studies in Archaeology and in Human, Social, and Political Sciences.

She has received research funding from a range of research councils, including  the Cultural Heritage and the Re-construction of Identities after Conflict project, and the Leverhulme Trust funded Changing Beliefs of the Human Body project. Sørensen is undertaking excavations at the Bronze Age tell at Százhalombatta, Hungary, and at an early Luso-African settlement on Santiago Island, Cape Verde.

Her monograph Gender Archaeology is a key publication.

Honours and awards 
Sørensen was elected as a Fellow of the Society of Antiquaries of London (FSA) on 10 October 2010. In 2022, she was elected a Fellow of the British Academy (FBA), the United Kingdom's national academy for the humanities and social sciences.

Sørensen was awarded the 16th European Archaeology Heritage Prize in 2014, in recognition of her exceptional contributions to heritage preservation. She gave the Felix Neubergh lecture at the Gothenburg University, Sweden, and received the Rigmor and Carl Holst-Knudsens Science Prize from Aarhus University in 2014. In 2019 she was elected as a member of the Det Kongelige Norske Videnskabers Selskab (The Royal Norwegian Society of Sciences and Letters).

Selected publications 
Sørensen M.L.S. 1997. Reading Dress: the construction of social categories and identities in Bronze Age Europe. Journal of European Archaeology 5(1), 93–114.
Diaz-Andreu M. and Sørensen M.L.S. 1998. Excavating Women: A History of Women in European Archaeology. London: Routledge.
Sørensen M.L.S. 2000. Gender Archaeology. Cambridge: Polity Press.
Sørensen M.L.S. 2009. Gender, Material Culture and Identity in the Viking Age Diaspora. Viking and Medieval Scandinavia 5, 245–261.
Sorensen M.L.S. and Rebay-Salisbury K. 2009. Landscapes of the body: burials of the Middle Bronze Age in Hungary. European Journal of Archaeology 11(1), 49–74. DOI: 10.1177/1461957108101241
Rebay-Salisbury, K., Sorensen, M.L.S and Hughes, J. (eds.), 2010. Body Parts and Bodies Whole: Changing Relations and Meanings. Oxford: Oxbow Books.
Sørensen M.L.S. 2010. Households. In T. Earle (ed.), Organizing Bronze Age Societies. The Mediterranean, Central Europe & Scandinavia Compared. Cambridge: Cambridge University Press. 122–154.

References 

Academic staff of Leiden University
Fellows of Jesus College, Cambridge
Royal Norwegian Society of Sciences and Letters
Danish archaeologists
1954 births
Living people
Danish women archaeologists
Fellows of the Society of Antiquaries of London
Fellows of the British Academy